Suradi Rukimin (born 28 October 1959) is an Indonesian archer. He competed in the men's individual event at the 1984 Summer Olympics.

References

1959 births
Living people
Indonesian male archers
Olympic archers of Indonesia
Archers at the 1984 Summer Olympics
Place of birth missing (living people)
Archers at the 1982 Asian Games
Asian Games medalists in archery
Asian Games silver medalists for Indonesia
Medalists at the 1982 Asian Games
20th-century Indonesian people